Nsaba is a town in the Central Region of Ghana. The Nsaba Presbyterian Secondary School, a second cycle institution, is located in the town.

References

Populated places in the Central Region (Ghana)